Kazem-Dashi is a rock, located in about fifty meters from shore in Lake Urmia. Because of its beautiful nature, it is one of the tourist attractions in West Azarbaijan province of Iran.

References 

Geography of Iran
West Azerbaijan Province

de:Kazem-Dashi
fa:کاظم‌داشی